Tin Shui Wai is a Light Rail stop and interchange station for Tuen Ma line. This Light Rail stop is located at Tin Fuk Road in Tin Shui Wai, at the ground level of the MTR Tin Shui Wai station.

The former Tin Shui Wai Terminus was renamed Tin Wing stop on 1 August 2003 to avoid confusion with this Light Rail stop.

Station layout

References

External links

MTR Tin Shui Wai Station location map

MTR Light Rail stops
Tin Shui Wai
Railway stations in Hong Kong opened in 2003

ja:天水囲駅